Yves Daniel Darricau (born 2 August 1953) is a Lebanese épée, foil and sabre fencer. He competed at the 1972 and 1984 Summer Olympics.

References

External links
 

1953 births
Living people
Lebanese male épée fencers
Olympic fencers of Lebanon
Fencers at the 1972 Summer Olympics
Fencers at the 1984 Summer Olympics
Lebanese male foil fencers
Lebanese male sabre fencers